The Pensacola Fliers were a Minor League Baseball team, based in Pensacola, Florida, United States, that operated in the Southeastern League between 1928 and 1950. They won 3 league championships, in 1939, 1949 and 1950.

The team originated as the Pensacola Flyers in 1928 and operated through 1930. After a brief hiatus, they reformed as the Pensacola Pilots which lasted through World War II. After the war they returned as the Fliers.

They had affiliation agreements with the Brooklyn Dodgers (1938), Philadelphia Phillies (1939–1940), Washington Senators (1946) and Atlanta Crackers (1949–1950).

The 1949 Fliers were recognized as one of the 100 greatest minor league teams of all time.

Notable players

Saul Rogovin, Major League Baseball pitcher; 1951 AL ERA leader

Year-by-Year Record

References

External links
Pensacola, Florida baseball reference
1949 Pilots
Baseball in Pensacola book

Defunct minor league baseball teams
Brooklyn Dodgers minor league affiliates
Philadelphia Phillies minor league affiliates
Washington Senators minor league affiliates
Pensacola metropolitan area
Defunct baseball teams in Florida
Sports in Pensacola, Florida
1927 establishments in Florida
1950 disestablishments in Florida
Baseball teams established in 1927
Baseball teams disestablished in 1950
Southeastern League teams